Annecy Film Festival may refer to:

 Annecy International Animated Film Festival
 Annecy Italian Film Festival